In database management and information architecture, a data bank or databank is a repository of information about one or more subjects, that is, a database which is organized in a way that facilitates local or remote information retrieval and is able to process many continual queries over a long period of time. 
A data bank may also refer to an organization primarily concerned with the construction and maintenance of such a database. 

A data bank may be either centralized or decentralized, though most usage of this term refers to centralized storage and retrieval of information, by way of analogy to a monetary bank. The data in a data bank can be anything from scientific information like global temperature readings, and governmental information like census statistics, to financial-system records like credit card transactions, or the inventory available from various suppliers.  

In computing, the term databank is also obsolete (1960s through 1970s) computer jargon for database itself, and is frequently used in that sense in materials written during the same time period.

See also 
 Data repository
 List of databases
 Star Wars Databank
 Protein Data Bank
 National Trauma Data Bank
 Memory bank
 International Tree-Ring Data Bank
 Hazardous Substances Data Bank
 Electron microscopy data bank
 Dortmund Data Bank
 Casio Databank
 Conformational dynamics data bank
 Databank Systems Limited  a former New Zealand banking agency

Sources

The American Heritage Dictionary of the English Language, Fourth Edition. Houghton Mifflin, 2000.

External links

Data management
Information architecture